Welcome Back may refer to:

 Welcome Back (iKon album), 2015
 Welcome Back (John Sebastian album), 1976
 "Welcome Back" (John Sebastian song), 1976, theme song for Welcome Back, Kotter
 Welcome Back (Mase album), 2004
 "Welcome Back" (Mase song), 2004
 Welcome Back (film), a 2015 Bollywood film
 Welcome Back, Kotter, an American television sitcom
 Welcome Back, Brotter, a Boston University student TV series
 "Welcome Back" program, Sony's compensation to users for the 2011 PlayStation Network outage

English phrases